This is a list of notable Cuban baseball players who have defected since the beginning of Fidel Castro's presidency. Prior to the Cuban Revolution, which saw Castro rise to power in 1959, Cuban-born players often played in the American Negro leagues and in Major League Baseball (MLB). Following the revolution, U.S.-Cuba relations became strained, and Castro ended professional baseball in Cuba and forbade Cuban players to play abroad.

Some players defected during the Cold War. Rogelio Álvarez, who debuted in MLB in 1960, was barred from continuing his professional career in the United States, and defected from Cuba through Mexico in 1963. Bárbaro Garbey left Cuba in the Mariel boatlift in 1980. After the fall of the Soviet Union in 1991, Cuba's economy struggled badly and faced severe repercussions from the Embargo. Baseball players began to seek careers in MLB due to the high salaries. In 1991, René Arocha defected. He was followed by Rey Ordóñez in 1993. Rolando Arrojo defected during the 1996 Summer Olympics, which were held in the United States. The Cuban government treats attempted defectors as disloyal, which led to increased defections. Orlando Hernández was loyal to Cuba, until they banned him from the national team following the defection of his half-brother, Liván.

Players attempting to play in MLB often choose not to defect to the United States or Canada, because establishing residency in the United States or Canada means they must enter the MLB Draft. If they defect to another nation, they can become free agents, allowing them to choose their offer.

In 2008, Joe Kehoskie, a former baseball agent who represented several dozen Cuban players, told author Michael Lewis, "There’s at least half a billion dollars of baseball players in Cuba right now and probably a lot more." By the end of 2014, approximately 30 subsequent Cuban defectors had signed MLB contracts totaling just under $500 million.

The largest contract given to a Cuban defector is outfielder Rusney Castillo's seven-year contract with the Boston Red Sox, signed in 2014, worth $72.5 million. First baseman José Dariel Abreu signed a six-year contract worth $68 million with the Chicago White Sox in 2013. The largest contract given to a pitcher was the $32 million the New York Yankees gave to José Contreras in 2002, while the Cincinnati Reds signed Aroldis Chapman for $30.25 million in 2010.

While some players who defect succeed in obtaining multimillion-dollar contracts to play in MLB, many receive only minor league contracts and do not reach MLB, and many others don't sign an MLB contract at all. Players are often separated from their families. This can lead to severed relationships, such as between Jorge Toca and the mother of his son.

List

See also

List of Cuban soccer players who have defected to the United States
List of Major League Baseball players from Cuba

References

Baseball
Cuban
Baseball players from Cuba